Tyrone Trice (Born October 23, 1963) is an American former professional boxer who competed from 1983 to 1996. He is a one-time International Boxing Council (IBC) Middleweight champion and WBA Americas Welterweight champion. Trice also had two world-title challenges for the IBF Welterweight and WBO Middleweight titles.

Professional career

Welterweight 
Trice quickly rose through the ranks, winning his first twelve fights before a shock first-round KO loss to Freddie Pendleton. After continuing to win many fights via knockout, Trice became the number two contender for the vacant IBF Welterweight title. A title match with number one contender Simon Brown took place at the Palais des sports in Berck-sur-Mer, France on April 23, 1988. Trice was dominant in the fight early on, knocking down Brown in the second round. However, he eventually tired through the later rounds and Brown was able to wear Trice down. Trice was knocked down three times in the 12th round and was finally defeated via knockout in the 14th round.

After the loss, Trice recovered and won a series of tune-up fights before defeating Kevin Pompey for the WBA Americas Welterweight Title. A rematch was then fought between Trice and Brown. As with the first contest, it was a close and entertaining fight with Brown prevailing again, this time in the eleventh round by knockout. After this loss, Trice decided to compete in the Middleweight division.

Middleweight  
In his first Middleweight bout, Trice defeated Rafael Williams to win the vacant IBC Light-Middleweight Title. After an impressive third-round TKO victory over undefeated Nestor Maciel to defend the title, Trice challenged John David Jackson for the WBO Light-Middleweight title. Trice took Jackson to the full twelve rounds but Jackson was well in control throughout the match, staggering Trice several times in the fight and winning via unanimous decision. Trice was then defeated again two months later in a ninth-round TKO by Julio César Vásquez.

Feud with James Toney 
Rumours began circulating that a matchup between Trice and multiple Middleweight champion James Toney would take place between late 1992 to early 1993. After an easy round one TKO victory over Ron Collins for which Toney was present in the ringside audience, Trice seized the microphone from announcer Wally Jackson after he was declared the victor. After insulting then WBO Middleweight Champion Gerald McClellan (who Trice claimed backed out of a title bout against him), Trice challenged Toney to a $50,000 bet that he would defeat him before 10 rounds at any time of Toney's choosing. Toney, angry at Trice's words, entered the ring and challenged Trice to a fight then and there. Trice approached Toney but was then escorted out of the ring by his ring crew and the referee.

Ultimately the much anticipated match between Trice and Toney never materialized due to a number of disputes between both camps regarding money, the venue where the bout should take place and several other factors.

Later Career and Retirement 
Trice's career would begin to decline from late 1992 until his retirement, losing several fights which included losses to Thomas Tate and Joe Lipsey. He also did not participate in any further title matches. His final match took place on February 18, 1996, where he defeated the unrated Gary Jones in a fourth-round knockout. He retired shortly after. He continues to reside in his hometown of  Milwaukee today.

Professional boxing record

|-
|align="center" colspan=8|43 Wins (35 knockouts, 8 decisions), 10 Losses (5 knockouts, 5 decisions) 
|-
| align="center" style="border-style: none none solid solid; background: #e3e3e3"|Result
| align="center" style="border-style: none none solid solid; background: #e3e3e3"|Record
| align="center" style="border-style: none none solid solid; background: #e3e3e3"|Opponent
| align="center" style="border-style: none none solid solid; background: #e3e3e3"|Type
| align="center" style="border-style: none none solid solid; background: #e3e3e3"|Round
| align="center" style="border-style: none none solid solid; background: #e3e3e3"|Date
| align="center" style="border-style: none none solid solid; background: #e3e3e3"|Location
| align="center" style="border-style: none none solid solid; background: #e3e3e3"|Notes
|-align=center
|Win
|
|align=left| Gary Jones
|KO
|4
|18/02/1996
|align=left| Minot, North Dakota
|align=left|
|-
|Loss
|
|align=left| Eric L. French
|UD
|10
|03/12/1994
|align=left| Eagles Auditorium, Milwaukee, Wisconsin
|align=left|
|-
|Loss
|
|align=left| Joe Lipsey
|PTS
|10
|23/07/1993
|align=left| Lansing, Michigan
|align=left|
|-
|Loss
|
|align=left| Frederic Seillier
|KO
|9
|24/04/1993
|align=left| Port-de-Bouc, Bouches-du-Rhone
|align=left|
|-
|Win
|
|align=left| Jake Torrance
|UD
|8
|05/02/1993
|align=left| Eagles Auditorium, Milwaukee, Wisconsin
|align=left|
|-
|Loss
|
|align=left| Thomas Tate
|UD
|10
|02/02/1993
|align=left| The Palace of Auburn Hills, Auburn Hills, Michigan
|align=left|
|-
|Loss
|
|align=left| Brett Lally
|MD
|10
|24/11/1992
|align=left| The Palace of Auburn Hills, Auburn Hills, Michigan
|align=left|
|-
|Win
|
|align=left| Bill "Fireball" Bradley
|TKO
|4
|25/08/1992
|align=left| The Palace of Auburn Hills, Auburn Hills, Michigan
|align=left|
|-
|Win
|
|align=left| Ron Collins
|TKO
|1
|21/07/1992
|align=left| The Palace of Auburn Hills, Auburn Hills, Michigan
|align=left|
|-
|Win
|
|align=left| Larry Lipscomb
|KO
|3
|28/03/1992
|align=left| Doraville, Georgia
|align=left|
|-
|Loss
|
|align=left| Julio César Vásquez
|TKO
|9
|19/09/1991
|align=left| Paris
|align=left|
|-
|Loss
|
|align=left| J.D. Jackson
|UD
|12
|21/07/1991
|align=left| Atlantic City Race Course, Atlantic City, New Jersey
|align=left|
|-
|Win
|
|align=left| Nestor Maciel
|TKO
|3
|07/03/1991
|align=left| Palacio de Deportes de la Comunidad de Madrid, Madrid, Spain
|align=left|
|-
|Win
|
|align=left| Rafael Williams
|TKO
|6
|29/11/1990
|align=left| Walter Kerr Theatre, New York City
|align=left|
|-
|Loss
|
|align=left| Simon "Mantequilla" Brown
|TKO
|10
|01/04/1990
|align=left| DC Armory, Washington, District of Columbia
|align=left|
|-
|Win
|
|align=left| Kevin Pompey
|UD
|12
|14/01/1990
|align=left| Caesars Atlantic City, Atlantic City, New Jersey
|align=left|
|-
|Win
|
|align=left| Ron Johnson
|TKO
|3
|25/03/1989
|align=left| Sheraton Hotel, Casablanca, Morocco
|align=left|
|-
|Win
|
|align=left| Dexter Smith
|PTS
|10
|06/03/1989
|align=left| Nogent-le-Phaye, France
|align=left|
|-
|Win
|
|align=left| Juan Alonso Villa
|KO
|1
|12/12/1988
|align=left| Nogent-le-Phaye, France
|align=left|
|-
|Win
|
|align=left| Orlando Orozco
|KO
|1
|09/11/1988
|align=left| Paris, France
|align=left|
|-
|Win
|
|align=left| Luis Francisco Perez
|TKO
|2
|09/10/1988
|align=left| Franconville, France
|align=left|
|-
|Win
|
|align=left| Efren Brown
|TKO
|6
|24/09/1988
|align=left| Berck, France
|align=left|
|-
|Win
|
|align=left|Luciano Fernandez
|TKO
|4
|13/08/1988
|align=left| Deauville, France
|align=left|
|-
|Loss
|
|align=left| Simon "Mantequilla" Brown
|TKO
|14
|23/04/1988
|align=left| Palais des Sports, Berck, France
|align=left|
|-
|Win
|
|align=left| Mike English
|TKO
|1
|20/11/1987
|align=left| Cobo Hall, Detroit, Michigan
|align=left|
|-
|Win
|
|align=left| Walter Cowans
|TKO
|2
|10/10/1987
|align=left| Sandusky, Ohio
|align=left|
|-
|Win
|
|align=left| Steve "Lightning" Little
|UD
|10
|06/08/1987
|align=left| Felt Forum, New York City
|align=left|
|-
|Win
|
|align=left| Dennis Johnson
|TKO
|8
|23/10/1986
|align=left| Cobo Arena, Detroit, Michigan
|align=left|
|-
|Win
|
|align=left| Curtis Summit
|TKO
|1
|10/06/1986
|align=left| Detroit, Michigan
|align=left|
|-
|Win
|
|align=left| Marvin Ray Jones
|TKO
|2
|24/04/1986
|align=left| Cobo Arena, Detroit, Michigan
|align=left|
|-
|Win
|
|align=left| Jesse Flores
|TKO
|4
|22/03/1986
|align=left| Lawlor Events Center, Reno, Nevada
|align=left|
|-
|Win
|
|align=left| Steve Mitchell
|KO
|6
|28/02/1986
|align=left| Laughlin, Nevada
|align=left|
|-
|Win
|
|align=left| Michael "Bomber" Bradley
|RTD
|3
|23/01/1986
|align=left| Cobo Arena, Detroit, Michigan
|align=left|
|-
|Win
|
|align=left| Dave Odem
|TKO
|7
|21/11/1985
|align=left| Detroit, Michigan
|align=left|
|-
|Win
|
|align=left| Jose "Speedy" Gonzalez
|KO
|5
|24/10/1985
|align=left| Cobo Arena, Detroit, Michigan
|align=left|
|-
|Win
|
|align=left| Tyrone Moore
|UD
|10
|12/09/1985
|align=left| Cobo Hall, Detroit, Michigan
|align=left|
|-
|Win
|
|align=left|Jesus De la Cruz
|KO
|1
|22/08/1985
|align=left| Detroit, Michigan
|align=left|
|-
|Win
|
|align=left| Ken Willis
|KO
|3
|06/04/1985
|align=left| Bally's Park Place, Atlantic City, New Jersey
|align=left|
|-
|Win
|
|align=left| Anthony Bryant
|TKO
|3
|24/10/1984
|align=left| Cobo Arena, Detroit, Michigan
|align=left|
|-
|Win
|
|align=left| Tyrone Moore
|PTS
|10
|15/08/1984
|align=left| Las Vegas, Nevada
|align=left|
|-
|Loss
|
|align=left| Freddie Pendleton
|TKO
|1
|28/06/1984
|align=left| Detroit, Michigan
|align=left|
|-
|Win
|
|align=left|Ruben Gallardo
|TKO
|6
|31/05/1984
|align=left| Detroit, Michigan
|align=left|
|-
|Win
|
|align=left| Teddy Hatfield
|TKO
|2
|03/05/1984
|align=left| Cobo Hall, Detroit, Michigan
|align=left|
|-
|Win
|
|align=left| Bob Graddy
|TKO
|6
|15/04/1984
|align=left| Detroit, Michigan
|align=left|
|-
|Win
|
|align=left|Sean McGill
|KO
|2
|11/02/1984
|align=left| Joe Louis Arena, Detroit, Michigan
|align=left|
|-
|Win
|
|align=left| Nate Stewart
|TKO
|2
|03/02/1984
|align=left| Americana Congress Hotel, Chicago, Illinois
|align=left|
|-
|Win
|
|align=left| Victor Gordon
|KO
|4
|27/10/1983
|align=left| Atlantic City, New Jersey
|align=left|
|-
|Win
|
|align=left| Leslie Toney
|TKO
|2
|30/09/1983
|align=left| Eagles Club, Milwaukee, Wisconsin
|align=left|
|-
|Win
|
|align=left| Dave Odem
|PTS
|6
|25/08/1983
|align=left| Lakeland Arena, Waterford, Michigan
|align=left|
|-
|Win
|
|align=left| Manuel Toribio
|KO
|2
|10/07/1983
|align=left| Caesars Atlantic City, Atlantic City, New Jersey
|align=left|
|-
|Win
|
|align=left| Willy Paul Maxwell
|KO
|1
|12/06/1983
|align=left| Phoenix, Arizona
|align=left|
|-
|Win
|
|align=left| Fred Tice
|TKO
|1
|04/06/1983
|align=left| Traverse City, Michigan
|align=left|
|-
|Win
|
|align=left| "Rockin" Rodney Moore
|PTS
|4
|26/05/1983
|align=left| The Sands, Atlantic City, New Jersey
|align=left|
|}

References

1963 births
Living people
Boxers from Wisconsin
Middleweight boxers
Welterweight boxers
Sportspeople from Milwaukee
American male boxers